Leszek Korzeniowski (born 1 January 1955, in Warsaw) is a Polish politician. He was elected to the Sejm on 25 September 2005, getting 7,798 votes in 21 Opole district as a candidate from the Civic Platform list.

He was also a member of Sejm 2001–05.

See also
Members of Polish Sejm 2005–07

External links
Leszek Korzeniowski - parliamentary page - includes declarations of interest, voting record, and transcripts of speeches.

Members of the Polish Sejm 2005–2007
Members of the Polish Sejm 2001–2005
Civic Platform politicians
1955 births
Living people
Members of the Polish Sejm 2007–2011
Members of the Polish Sejm 2011–2015